The Loyola Residence Tower (also known as the Ignatius Loyola Residence) in Halifax, Canada is a residence of Saint Mary's University completed in 1971. It is located on the main campus with a height of 67 metres accommodating up to 434 students on 22 floors.

It is notable as the home of the Burke-Gaffney Observatory, part of the university's Department of Astronomy and Physics. The building also houses the St. Mary's University Art Gallery, which is situated on the ground floor.

In early 2023, the south-facing concrete façade of the tower was replaced with solar panels in order to reduce the university's carbon footprint. Retrofitted at a cost of C$8.5 million, the installation is expected to generate around 100,000 kWh yearly, and makes the Loyola Residence the tallest solar-integrated building in North America.

See also
 List of astronomical observatories

References

External links
 Profile of The Ignatius Loyola Residence, St. Mary's University
 Emporis

Astronomical observatories in Canada
Buildings and structures in Halifax, Nova Scotia
Saint Mary's University (Halifax)
Solar architecture